is a Prefectural Natural Park in Wakayama Prefecture, Japan. Established in 2020, the park spans the borders of the municipalities of Kozagawa, Shingū, and Tanabe. The park's central feature is the eponymous .

See also
 National Parks of Japan
 List of Places of Scenic Beauty of Japan (Wakayama)

References

External links
  Map of Ōtōsan Prefectural Natural Park

Parks and gardens in Wakayama Prefecture
Kozagawa, Wakayama
Shingū, Wakayama
Tanabe, Wakayama
Protected areas established in 2020
2020 establishments in Japan